La Berrichonne de Châteauroux, commonly referred to as La Berrichonne or simply Châteauroux, is a French association football club based in Châteauroux. The football team is a part of a sports club that consists of several other sports and was founded in 1916. The team currently plays in the Championnat National, the third division of French football. The club has played only one season in Ligue 1; the 1997–98 season.

In 2004, Châteauroux reached the final of the 2003–04 Coupe de France. The team was defeated 1–0 by Paris Saint-Germain, but still qualified for the following season's UEFA Cup because Paris Saint-Germain finished second in the first division. Châteauroux lost in the first round to Belgian club Club Brugge.

Châteauroux plays its home fixtures at the 17,173 capacity Stade Gaston Petit in front of crowds averaging between 6,000 and 7,000. Visitors are directed to one end of the Credit Agricole stand. The team strip is a deep red and blue with a vertical striped shirt and blue shorts. Châteauroux's kit manufacturer is Nike.

Honours 

 Ligue 2
Champions (1): 1996–97
 Championnat National
Champions (1): 2016–17
Coupe de France
Runners-up (1): 2003–04

Players

Current squad

Out on loan

Reserve team

Managers

Affiliated clubs

 Sheffield United FC (2020–present)
 Kerala United FC (2020–present)
 Al-Hilal United (2020–present)
 K Beerschot VA (2020–present)

References 

 
Association football clubs established in 1916
Sport in Indre
1916 establishments in France
Football clubs in France
Football clubs in Centre-Val de Loire
Ligue 1 clubs